Milton Lake is a lake in Saskatchewan, Canada, located near the boundary with the Northwest Territories. The Milton Lake Lodge is accessible by float plane and located on the lake.

See also
List of lakes of Saskatchewan

References

External links
 Milton Lake Lodge

Lakes of Saskatchewan